B4X is a suite of rapid application development IDEs and proprietary programming language that allows the creation of applications on the following platforms: Google Android, Apple iOS, Java, Raspberry Pi and Arduino. Although the B4X syntax is very similar to BASIC, it is an entirely new language. 

B4A, B4i, and B4J feature a visual designer that simplifies the process of creating user interfaces. B4R does not feature a visual designer due to the nature of single-board and SoC devices.

For learning the language, there is a comprehensive set of eBooks called "B4X Booklets" available for free that act as a learning guide. There is also a library of videos made by Erel available to consume.

Basic4PPC
Basic4ppc (pronounced "Basic for PPC") was the first IDE produced by Anywhere Software. Basic4ppc allowed programmers to write applications for Pocket PC devices that ran the Windows Mobile operating system. Basic4PPC was released in 2005 and its final release was in December of 2018. Basic4PPC is no longer available for purchase.

B4A
B4A (formerly known as Basic4android) is the second IDE produced by Anywhere Software. The first public version was released on December 7, 2010, and allows users to code native Android apps in B4X. B4A is able to create apps, widgets, and games. There is also a beginners guide that is updated after each new release of the IDE. On February 5, 2020, B4A became free. There are no plans to make B4i free.

B4J
B4J is the third IDE produced by Anywhere Software. The first public version was released on December 4, 2013. B4J targets the following platforms: Desktops, Web Servers, and ARM Boards such as Raspberry Pi.

B4i
B4i is the fourth IDE produced by Anywhere Software. B4i is capable of creating applications that target iPhone and iPad devices and there is a separate service which allows developers to compile and publish apps without the need for a local Mac computer. The first public version was released on November 14, 2014.

B4R
B4R is the fifth IDE produced by Anywhere Software. B4R allows programmers to write applications for Arduino boards. Supported Arduino modules include: ESP8266 and ESP32.

Release history

Code examples

Comments
Comments are usually used to point out what a particular piece of code does. Comments can also be used to describe whole methods. Compilers ignore comments so use comments for whatever you want!'This is a comment

Displaying a random number in a message box. 
Declare a XUI variable in "Process_Globals","Globals", or "Class_Globals":Private xui As XUIGenerate the random number and then display it in a message box:Public Sub MyButton_Click
    Dim Random As Int = Rnd(1,10)
    xui.MsgboxAsync(Random, "Your random number")
End Sub

Displaying a random number in a message box (legacy method). 
The following code can be shared between B4A, B4i, and B4J with no changing:
Sub MyButton_Click
    Dim Random As Int = Rnd(1, 10)
    #If B4J
    fx.Msgbox(Form, Random, "Your Number")
    #Else
    MsgBox(Random, "Your Number")
    #End If
End Sub

References 

Integrated development environments
Software development process
Free integrated development environments